Novoilikovo (Yañı İlek) is a rural locality (a selo) in Kileyevsky Selsoviet, Bakalinsky District, Bashkortostan, Russia. The population was 369 as of 2010. There are 4 streets.

Geography 
Novoilikovo is located 21 km north of Bakaly (the district's administrative centre) by road. Syngryanovo is the nearest rural locality.

References 

Rural localities in Bakalinsky District